Whiskey Tango Foxtrot is a 2016 American biographical war comedy-drama film, directed by Glenn Ficarra and John Requa and written by Robert Carlock. It is based on the memoir The Taliban Shuffle: Strange Days in Afghanistan and Pakistan by Kim Barker. The film stars Tina Fey, Margot Robbie, Martin Freeman, Alfred Molina, and Billy Bob Thornton. It was released on March 4, 2016, by Paramount Pictures. It received mixed reviews from critics who praised the acting, but criticized the predictable screenplay and execution. The movie grossed $24.9 million against its $35 million budget.

Plot
In 2003 New York City, Kim Baker (Tina Fey) is a television journalist who is dissatisfied with the state of her career covering low-profile stories. She decides to take a short assignment as a war correspondent in Afghanistan during Operation Enduring Freedom, to the disappointment of her boyfriend Chris (Josh Charles), who spends a lot of time traveling. Assigned to low-budget living quarters with other international journalists, she develops a friendship with noted BBC correspondent Tanya Vanderpoel (Margot Robbie) and lecherous Scottish freelance photographer Iain MacKelpie (Martin Freeman). After a period of adjustment, aided by her Afghan "fixer" Fahim Ahmadzai (Christopher Abbott), she begins taking well to the assignment. She elicits frank remarks on camera from soldiers questioning the value of their assignment there and puts herself in harm's way to capture combat incidents on video. American Marine commander General (previously Colonel) Hollanek (Billy Bob Thornton) sees her as an inexperienced nuisance.

Despite the danger, Kim stays in Afghanistan for months, then years, beyond her original assignment. She catches Chris unprepared with a middle-of-the-night video call and finds him with another woman, ending their relationship. Against her better judgment, she begins a sexual relationship with Iain, which develops into a more personal one over time. Although her status as a woman presents challenges in an Afghan Islamic society that places restrictive roles on women, she also uses it to her advantage. Kim gains access to women in a village who explain that they have been sabotaging the US-built well because they welcome the daily walk to the river away from the men. She also walks a tightrope, taking advantage of the thinly-veiled sexual interest of Afghan Attorney General Ali Massoud Sadiq (Alfred Molina) to use him as a source. Fahim – who treated opium addicts before the war – cautions her, pointing out that danger can be like a drug.

Despite their mutual friendliness, Kim competes with other journalists for stories and resources from their employers back home. After three years in Afghanistan, Kim flies to New York to argue for more support from her network's new boss, only to discover that Tanya is slated to take over from her. Meanwhile, Iain is kidnapped for ransom while traveling cross-country to cover a developing story he had offered to bring Kim in on. She returns "home" to Afghanistan, where she blackmails her "special friend," Ali, for information about Iain's whereabouts, and impresses upon Hollanek the political value to him of rescuing Iain. The mission – accompanied by Kim's cameraman – is a success, militarily and journalistically. However, shortly after Iain's rescue, Kim becomes disillusioned with her tentative relationship and station. She then bids farewell to her colleagues and Fahim and returns to the U.S. to stay.

After returning, she looks up a Marine (Evan Jonigkeit) who was transferred, apparently because of his on-camera comments to her, and subsequently lost both of his legs to an IED. She tries to apologize for the consequences of her actions, but he refuses to let her take the blame. She moves on to an on-camera desk job, where she finds herself interviewing Iain, who is going to be in New York soon as part of a tour for his new book, and who invites her to meet him for coffee.

Cast
 Tina Fey as Kim Baker, a cable news reporter.
 Margot Robbie as Tanya Vanderpoel, a British BBC News TV journalist whom Kim admires and befriends.
 Martin Freeman as Iain MacKelpie, Kim's unexpected love interest and a dedicated Scottish photojournalist.
 Christopher Abbott as Fahim Ahmadzai, who acts as driver, translator, and all-around handyman for reporters.
 Billy Bob Thornton as Colonel later Brigadier General Hollanek, US Marine Corps, a military man who initially scares Kim.
 Alfred Molina as Ali Massoud Sadiq, a local official who has a romantic interest in her.
 Sheila Vand as Shakira El-Khoury, a Lebanese reporter who works alongside Kim and Tanya.
 Nicholas Braun as Tall Brian, Kim's cameraman.
 Steve Peacocke as Nic, Kim's alpha male bodyguard.
 Evan Jonigkeit as Lance Corporal Coughlin, a member of 3rd Battalion, 5th Marines when Baker is embedded.
 Scott Takeda as Ed Faber.
 Josh Charles as Chris, Kim's boyfriend back in the States.
 Cherry Jones as Geri Taub.
 Sterling K. Brown as Sergeant Hurd, another member of 3rd Battalion, 5th Marines.
 Thomas Kretschmann as an airplane passenger.

Production
In February 2014, Tina Fey confirmed that her production company, Little Stranger, would adapt the memoir The Taliban Shuffle: Strange Days in Afghanistan and Pakistan by Kim Barker of the Chicago Tribune into a film. Fey would star in the lead role in the film, which would be produced by Lorne Michaels and written by Robert Carlock. On June 30, 2014, Paramount tapped Glenn Ficarra and John Requa to direct the film. On October 22, 2014, Margot Robbie joined the cast to play a competing reporter alongside Fey's character. On November 20, 2014, Martin Freeman was in talks to play Fey's character's unexpected love interest, a dedicated Scottish photojournalist. On January 10, 2015, it was reported that Nikolaj Coster-Waldau was in talks to join the film for a male lead role, although he did not ultimately star in the film. On February 2, 2015, Christopher Abbott joined the film's cast. On February 3, 2015, Nicholas Braun joined the film to play Tall Brian, Fey's character's cameraman, and the film had the working title Fun House. On February 9, 2015, Steve Peacocke was set to star in the film, playing Nic, Fey's character's alpha male bodyguard. On February 11, 2015, confirmed cast was announced, with Billy Bob Thornton, Alfred Molina, Sheila Vand, and Evan Jonigkeit also joining the cast of the film, in which Vand would play Shakira El-Khoury, a Lebanese reporter who works alongside Kim and Tanya.

Fey confirmed that the film's title would be Whiskey Tango Foxtrot in an interview with USA Today. Kim Barker was changed to a cable news reporter named "Baker".

The title is the NATO alphabet spelling of WTF, which stands for "What the fuck?"

Filming
On February 3, 2015, the Albuquerque Journal reported that filming was underway in Santa Fe, New Mexico. Fey was spotted filming in the Santa Fe University of Art and Design. On February 11, 2015, Paramount also confirmed that principal photography had commenced on the film in New Mexico. It was filmed in part at the historic Scottish Rite Temple in Santa Fe.  Production on the film concluded on April 10, 2015.

Release
The film was originally titled The Taliban Shuffle and Fun House, before settling on Whiskey Tango Foxtrot. It was released on March 4, 2016.  At the beginning of the rolling credits is a dedication to Fey's father, Donald Henry Fey, who died in 2015.

Home media
Whiskey Tango Foxtrot was released on DVD and Blu-ray on June 28, 2016.

Reception

Box office
Whiskey Tango Foxtrot grossed $23.1 million in North America and $1.8 million in other territories for a total of $24.9 million worldwide, against a production budget of $35 million.

In the United States and Canada, pre-release tracking suggested the film would gross $10–12 million from 2,374 theaters in its opening weekend, trailing fellow newcomers Zootopia ($60–70 million projection) and London Has Fallen ($20–23 million projection). The film ended up grossing $7.6 million in its opening weekend, finishing below expectations and 4th at the box office.

Critical response
On review aggregator website Rotten Tomatoes, the film holds an approval rating of 68% based on 209 reviews, with an average rating of 6.33/10. The site's critical consensus reads, "While WTF is far from FUBAR, Tina Fey and Martin Freeman are just barely enough to overcome the picture's glib predictability and limited worldview." Metacritic gives the film a weighted average score of 57 out of 100, based on 44 critics, indicating "mixed or average reviews". Audiences polled by CinemaScore gave the film an average grade of "B" on an A+ to F scale.

References

External links
 
 
 

2016 films
2010s English-language films
2010s war comedy-drama films
American war comedy-drama films
Films about journalism
Films about journalists
Films based on non-fiction books
Films directed by Glenn Ficarra and John Requa
Films produced by Lorne Michaels
Films produced by Tina Fey
Films set in Afghanistan
Films shot in New Mexico
Paramount Pictures films
Broadway Video films
War films based on actual events
War in Afghanistan (2001–2021) films
2016 comedy films
2016 drama films
Films produced by Ian Bryce
2010s American films